Sir Matthias Vincent (c. 1645–1687) was a British administrator for the East India Company (EIC) before becoming MP for Lostwithiel.

Family
He was the younger son of John Vincent (d.1646) of Battens, North Hill, Cornwall by his wife Sarah and educated at Westminster School. In 1620 John Vincent was disclaimed at the heralds’ visitation of 1620, and prosecuted in the court of chivalry for usurping the arms of the Surrey family. He then took holy orders but was unable to obtain a benefice before the Civil War and moved frequently. Matthias Vincent’s eldest brother became a fellow of All Souls in 1654.

India
Vincent joined the EIC as a factor in 1622 at a salary of £20 per annum. In 1667 he was appointed to the company's governing council in Hooghly, becoming third in seniority at the Bay of Bengal factories in 1669. Following the death of John Marsh, he became Chief at Cassimbazar, arousing the wrath of Joseph Hall who said that Vincents "Actions will not admit of the Light, being works of Darkness's and therefore all he doth in the Companys Affairs must be in hugger muggur." Nevertheless, on the death of Walter Clavell Vincent became "Chief of the factories in the Bay of Bengal".

During his time at Hooghly, Vincent was accused by the Company of appropriating commissions due to it and of trading in goods, including pepper and copper, on his own account. Furthermore, 
a member of the Council at Hooghly claimed that Vincent had "practised Diabolicall arts  with the Braminees (Brahmins)" and had bewitched him so that Vincent could "better fulfil his lustful desires with his Wife." His accuser, to the horror of Vincent's superiors in back in London, also claimed he had  used charms and poisons against people with the assistance of "Witches or other natives".

After the notorious interloper Thomas Pitt married Vincents's niece, the EIC lost confidence in Vincent. In 1682 William Hedges, the EIC's new Bengal Agent, arrived in Hooghly with instructions to remove Vincent from his post. However, aware that he was about to be taken prisoner, Vincent appeared with a party of well armed soldiers and forced Hedges to retreat to the Dutch settlement of Chinsurah further inland. Vincent's position was further strengthened by the arrival of his protege Thomas Pitt with more men. After two futile years, Hedges gave up in his attempt and fled India for Persia.

Rugo the Podar affair
In 1673 a charge was brought against Vincent that he had been responsible for the death of the Hooghly Factory's cashier or podar. Streynsham Master, the Company's erstwhile Madras Agent was ordered to investigate the matter. It transpired that Rugo had been placed in the custody of Anant Ram, the Factory's broker on Vincent's orders to recover a sum of money he owed to the Company. Rugo died the first night he was in custody, with Ram claiming in a later deposition that he had only caused the Podar and his son "to be beaten with a few blows with a small stick, as little as the pen that is written withall." The matter was closed (or hushed up) following a payment of 13,000 Rupees, which was charged to the Company's account. Although Vincent was cleared on the charge, the Company still sought his return to England and further legal action. At the same time he was ordered to repay the 13,000 Rupees.

Subsequent career
In 1683 Vincent returned to England aboard one of Thomas Pitt's ships to live in a princely style as a rich nabob. He was knighted by James I on 20March 1685, became treasurer of the Sons of the Clergy and was elected as MP for Lostwithiel, although he did not attend parliament. He was nominated as an alderman of the City of London in 1686 but died the following summer.

Personal life
In around 1670 he married Mary, the illegitimate daughter of Henry Greenhill, merchant, of Madras (now Chennai), India, by his Goanese mistress who was the widow of John Gurney a Madras merchant. The couple had two sons and one other child.

Notes

References

Bibliography

1645 births
1687 deaths
British East India Company people
People educated at Westminster School, London
British governors of Bengal